The London Hilton on Park Lane is a hotel situated on Park Lane, overlooking Hyde Park in the exclusive Mayfair district of London.

History
The hotel opened as the London Hilton on 17 April 1963. It is a concrete-framed building, designed by William B. Tabler, an American architect who designed numerous Hilton hotels. The building was the first skyscraper hotel to be built in London, containing more than 500 bedrooms and six restaurants.

On 24 August 1967, the Beatles met Maharishi Mahesh Yogi at the Hilton and subsequently went to Uttar Pradesh with him in order to meditate.

On 5 September 1975, the London Hilton was the target of an IRA bomb which killed two people and injured 63 others.

During the 1990s, the Pools Panel met each Saturday in a meeting room in the hotel.

A fire broke out in the hotel on 1 July 2011. There were no fatalities or injuries, and damage was limited to a few of the lower floors.

The London Hilton Park Lane served as the Olympic Family Hotel during the 2012 London Olympics, hosting members of the International Olympic Committee and other dignitaries attending the 2012 Games.

The hotel is also the site of the death of the Cranberries lead singer Dolores O'Riordan on 15 January 2018, aged 46. She had drowned in her room's bathtub after drinking an excessive amount of alcohol.

On 28 November 2022, Trader Vic's Worldwide announced the closure of their oldest running location inside of the London Hilton Park Lane. This sparked an online campaign try and revert the decision made by the Hilton, due to the valuable Polynesian interior that predated the hotel. The campaign was led by an online petition  which received over 7500 signatures, and an Instagram page. There was also a community Facebook group. Many celebrities became involved with the campaign, including presenter Jonathan Ross, and filmmaker Edgar Wright who both made statements in support of keeping the restaurant open. The restaurant closed on December 31, 2022, with no comment from the Hilton regarding the campaign.

Gallery

See also
London Hilton bombing
Hotels in London
Tall buildings in London

References

External links
The official hotel webpage

Hilton Hotels & Resorts hotels
Hotels in the City of Westminster
Hotel buildings completed in 1963
Hotels established in 1963
Skyscrapers in the City of Westminster
Skyscraper hotels in London